Amandugba (or Amanduba) is a town in the Isu Local Government Area in Imo State, Nigeria.

The community is inhabited by Isu people, a subgroup of the Igbo people.
In Amauzari tradition, the town is named after Ndugba, child of Mbama Onyeukwu.
As of September 2010, the traditional ruler of Amandugba was Eze Innocent Ikejiofor.

The community has four primary schools and one secondary technical school.
Amandugba and neighboring Umundugba used to be one town.
Both communities have suffered from an unreliable water supply from streams and brooks that often dry up, and that are breeding grounds for malaria-carrying mosquitoes and sources of diseases such as cholera, diarrhea, dysentery, guinea worm, tape worm, and night blindness. A recent project by Africa We Care, a charity, has started to develop a supply based on a bore-hole.

References

Towns in Imo State